Peace Together was a 20 July 1993 fundraiser compilation album released by the Peace Together organisation, dedicated to promoting peace in Northern Ireland, which was initiated by Robert Hamilton, of The Fat Lady Sings, and Ali McMordie of Stiff Little Fingers. Sasha King and Lisa Johnson also joined the Peace Together team at the inception.

Tracks 1 and 13 feature contributions from Peter Gabriel, Sinéad O'Connor, Feargal Sharkey, Nanci Griffith, Jah Wobble, Clive Langer, and members of the Hothouse Flowers.

Tracks
"Be Still" – 3:52
"What a Waste!" - Curve, Ian Dury – 5:01
"Games Without Frontiers" - Pop Will Eat Itself – 5:23
"Satellite of Love" - U2 – 3:51
"Invisible Sun" - Therapy? – 3:15
"Peace in Our Time" - Carter the Unstoppable Sex Machine – 3:49
"Religious Persuasion" - Billy Bragg, Sinéad O'Connor, Andy White – 5:40
"We Have All the Time in the World" - My Bloody Valentine – 3:15
"Bad Weather" - Young Disciples – 4:34
"John the Gun" - The Fatima Mansions – 4:26
"Oliver's Army" - Blur – 3:09
"When We Were Two Little Boys" - Rolf Harris, Liam Ó Maonlaí – 4:57
"Be Still" (Remix Featuring Elizabeth Fraser) – 3:52

Personnel 

Andy Baker – Engineer
Leo Barnes – Saxophone
Ben Blakeman – Guitar
Blur – Producer
Dave Burnham – Engineer
Fiach Cooling – Assistant Engineer
Ruadhri Cushnan – Engineer
Pete Davis – Drum Programming
Demus – Programming, Engineer, Mixing
Sean Devitt – Engineer
Tim Dorney – Keyboards
Fatima Mansions – Producer
Guy Fixsen – Engineer
Claudia Fontaine – Vocals (background)
The Frames – Choir, Chorus
Elizabeth Fraser – Vocals
Peter Gabriel – Vocals, Engineer
Robin Guthrie – Remixing
Matt Howe – Assistant Engineer
Kevin Jacobs – Engineer
Luis Jadim – Percussion
Pete Jones – Engineer, Assistant Engineer
Clive Langer – Guitar (Electric), Producer
Jon Mallison – Producer, Engineer
Steve Marker – Producer
Spencer May – Engineer
Paul Mortimer – Engineer
My Bloody Valentine – Engineer, Performer
Sinéad O'Connor – Vocals
Liam Ó Maonlaí – Vocals (background), Whistle (Human), Performer, Bodhran
Steve Osborne – Producer, Engineer
Andrew Paresi – Drum Programming
John Reynolds – Drums
Feargal Sharkey – Vocals
Chris Sheldon – Producer, Engineer
Kevin Shields – Producer
John Smith – Producer, Engineer
Danton Supple – Engineer
Therapy? – Producer
Simon Vinestock – Engineer
Jah Wobble – Bass
Young Disciples – Producer, Mixing

References

External links
Official site

All-star recordings
1993 compilation albums
Charity albums